Schistura maculosa,  the spotted stone loach, is a species of ray-finned fish in the family Nemacheilidae described from Tuingo and Pharsih Rivers, tributaries of Tuivai River (Barak drainage), Mizoram, India.

Etymology 
The specific name is derived from the Latin for ‘spotted’, referring to the numerous black spots on the caudal and dorsal fins. It is used as an adjective.

Description 
Dorsal-fin with 2 or 3 simple and 7½ branched rays; pectoral-fin with 11-13 rays; pelvic-fin with 8 rays; anal-fin with 3 simple and 5½ branched rays; caudal-fin branched rays 8+8.

References 

maculosa
Taxa named by Samuel Lalronunga
Taxa named by Lalnuntluanga
Taxa named by Lalramliana
Fish described in 2013